Antar is a 2013 unreleased Indian Marathi-language film directed by Gauri Sarwate, starring Sumeet Raghavan, Manasi Salvi and Tanishaa Mukerji in lead roles. The film has been jointly produced by Ashvini Yardi and actor Akshay Kumar for Grazing Goat Pictures.

Plot
Antar is the coming-of-age story of a young Maharashtrian student in the UK.

Cast
Sumeet Raghavan 
Tanishaa Mukerji
Manasi Salvi
Apeksha Dandekar
Bharati Achrekar
Vandana Gupte
Anjali Kusre

References

2010s Marathi-language films
2013 films